is a Japanese historical manga series by Keiji Nakazawa. Loosely based on Nakazawa's own experiences as a Hiroshima survivor. The series begins in 1945 in and around Hiroshima, Japan, where the six-year-old boy Gen Nakaoka lives with his family. After Hiroshima is destroyed by atomic bombing, Gen and other survivors are left to deal with the aftermath. It ran in several magazines, including Weekly Shōnen Jump, from 1973 to 1987. It was subsequently adapted into three live action film adaptations directed by Tengo Yamada, which were released between 1976 and 1980. Madhouse released two anime films, one in 1983 and one in 1986. In 2007, a live action television drama series adaptation aired in Japan on Fuji TV over two nights, August 10 and 11.

Publication history
Cartoonist Keiji Nakazawa created the feature Ore wa Mita (translated into English as I Saw It), an eyewitness account of the atomic-bomb devastation in Japan, in the monthly manga Monthly Shōnen Jump in 1972. It was published in the United States through Educomics in 1982. Nakazawa went on to serialize the longer, autobiographical Hadashi No Gen (Barefoot Gen) beginning in the June 4, 1973 edition of Weekly Shōnen Jump manga magazine. It was cancelled after a year and a half, moving to three other less widely distributed magazines: Shimin (Citizen), Bunka Hyōron (Cultural Criticism), and Kyōiku Hyōron (Educational Criticism). It was published in book collections in Japan beginning in 1975.

Plot

Volume 1: A Cartoon Story of Hiroshima
The story begins in Hiroshima in April 1945, during the final months of World War II. Six-year-old Gen Nakaoka and his family live in poverty and struggle to make ends meet. Gen's father Daikichi urges them to "live like wheat", which always grows strong despite being trod on. Daikichi is critical of the war. When he shows up drunk to a mandatory combat drill and talks back to his instructor, the Nakaokas are branded as traitors and become subject to harassment and discrimination by their neighbors. To restore his family's honor, Gen's older brother Koji joins the Imperial Navy against Daikichi's wishes, where he is subjected to a brutal training regimen by his commanding officer, which causes one of Koji's friends to kill himself. On August 6, the atomic bomb is dropped on Hiroshima. Gen's father and siblings perish in the fires, but he and his mother escape. The shock causes her to give premature birth; Gen names his new sister Tomoko, so she will grow up to have lots of friends ('Tomo' means 'friend').

Volume 2: The Day After
In the days following the attack, Gen and his mother witness the horrors wrought by the bomb. Hiroshima lies in ruins, and the city is full of people dead and dying from severe burns and radiation sickness. Gen meets a girl named Natsue, whose face has been severely burned. She attempts to commit suicide, but Gen convinces her to continue living. Gen and his mother adopt an orphan named Ryuta, who by sheer coincidence looks identical to Gen's deceased younger brother Shinji. After Gen returns to their burnt-out home and retrieves the remains of his father and siblings, he and his family move in with Kimie's friend Kiyo. However, Kiyo's stingy mother-in-law conspires with her spoiled grandchildren to drive the Nakaokas out, falsely accusing first the children, and then Kimie, of stealing rice that the grandchildren had themselves stolen.

Volume 3: Life After the Bomb
The family look for a vacancy in vain, since they cannot pay. In remorse, Kiyo invites them back but her mother-in-law demands rent. Gen looks for work to pay it. A man hires him to look after his brother Seiji, who has been burnt from head to toe and lives in squalor. Though Seiji is reluctant at first, he warms up to Gen over time. He learns that Seiji is an artist who has lost the will to live because his burns have left him unable to hold a brush. With Gen's help, Seiji learns to paint with his teeth, but eventually dies of his injuries. On August 14, Emperor Hirohito announces Japan's surrender over the radio, ending the war. When Kimie needs a doctor, Gen cannot find anyone who will help without payment in money or food.

Volume 4: Out of the Ashes
Following Japan's surrender, American occupation forces arrive to help the nation rebuild. Gen and Ryuta, fearing rumours they have heard about the Americans, arm themselves with a pistol they find in an abandoned weapons cache. They learn the Americans are not as bad as they had thought when they are given free candy, but they also witness a group of American soldiers harvesting organs from corpses for medical research. Kiyo's mother-in-law evicts the Nakaokas again after Gen gets into a fight with her grandchildren, and they move into an abandoned bomb shelter. Gen and Ryuta attempt to kill a dog to provide sufficient protein after they learn that they and the whole family are dying of malnutrition, but cannot bring themselves to do it. They try to steal American food, but the cans turn out to contain balloons. They try again to steal from the Americans with help from someone who turns out to be part of the local Yakuza (black market gangsters). After the Yakuza betray them, Ryuta kills two of them with the pistol they found. The head of a rival gang takes him in, and he leaves money outside Gen's front door before going off with the gangsters to avoid arrest. Returning to school, Gen and a girl, Michiko, are both mocked for being bald. Coming to her defence, Gen is challenged by a bully to a duel. Both must climb a tall tower, and the first to return with a pigeon's egg will win. The tower crumbles beneath them as they climb. Gen saves the bully, who now owes him. He discovers that the girl's sister was raped by an American soldier and became a prostitute [sic] to provide food for Michiko. Gen learns that Tomoko has been kidnapped. He learns a Buddhist prayer because he has been told that praying to the Buddha will help him find Tomoko, and tries it though he thinks it superstition. He follows the bully, whom he suspects knows something, and finds that a large number of victims of Hiroshima have been using her as their Princess to trick dying women into believing their missing babies have been found, and as an inspiration to the kidnappers to stop drinking. This is a little more than six months after the Bomb was dropped, when many who had survived are suddenly dying. He prays over a dead woman, which makes the kidnappers sorry, but they remain unwilling to return Tomoko, until she starts vomiting blood. The doctor says she is dying. In a blink, from being just over six months after, it is suddenly the 2nd anniversary of the dropping of the bomb on Hiroshima, in the midst of the doctor's visit. He says Tomoko's only chance is with expensive American medicine costing 100,000 yen. The kidnappers cannot raise enough. The bully makes a list of the dying, and Gen tries to earn money chanting Buddhist prayers, but it is not enough. Mr. Pak, the Korean neighbor from Volume 1 makes a surprise visit, and hands Gen 100,000 yen and American milk. Gen returns to his family with the money, but finds Tomoko is dead. He refuses to believe it, then refuses to speak, until he discovers that his hair is growing back, and remembers what his father told him, that he must keep growing, like wheat that grows straight and tall after being trampled.

Volume 5: The Never-Ending War
In December 1947, Gen is in school when Ryuta appears, who has become a juvenile delinquent working for the Yakuza. Gen meets orphans with Ryuta, including Katsuko, a girl scarred by burns from the bomb. As an orphan and a hibakusha, she is subject to discrimination and cannot go to school; Gen lends her his books and promises to teach her himself. On December 7, the Emperor visits Hiroshima, and the streets are lined with children waving homemade flags. Ryuta and other orphans learn to shoot a pistol since the head gangster, Masa, wants them to kill his rival, 'Mitey'. Donguri shoots Mitey and is killed. Gen encourages the others to flee, but Masa follows them. Ryuta shoots Masa in the shoulder and his henchman in the leg. They have built their own house, along with Gen, who does not wish to be a burden on his mother, where they live with an old man cast away by his relatives for being too ill from radiation to work. On New Year's Day, 1947, rice cakes are distributed for free, but the true cost is to cheer for the Emperor who got Japan into the war, which Gen refuses to do. He defies his teacher, reciting his father's beliefs. The same local official who had called Gen's father a traitor for being for peace, who Gen then rescued the day the Bomb was dropped, who then refused to help free Gen's father, brother, and sister, is now running for office claiming he was always for peace. Gen exposes him, and is thrown out of the meeting. Gen's mother is ill, and the doctor says the only way to help her is to take her to the American-run Atomic Bomb Casualty Commission (ABCC), but Gen and his mother oppose accepting American help. His older brother insists that she fight to live so she can raise the younger children to adulthood. The orphans decide to try to earn money shining shoes to help Gen's mother, and he sings to drum up business, but they are chased by orphan-catchers trying to take them to an orphanage. They assume Gen is an orphan, too. They escape, and ask the old man to become their father, "Papa", so they won't be orphans anymore, vulnerable to being hauled off. The old man is a novelist, but no one will publish his newest novel, because it is critical of the Americans for dropping the Bomb. Gen's mother goes to the ABCC, which gives her no help, only treating her as a specimen to be studied. Gen wonders why the doctor sent her there. He rescues a girl from bullies who call her a vulture. He learns that this is because her father collects dead victims of Hiroshima to take to the ABCC in order to make a living. Corrupt doctors get a kickback when they send people to the ABCC in the form of free medicine that they can sell at high prices. Gen sees boys fishing out skulls from the river and polishing them up to sell to the ABCC. At first he finds it sacrilegious, but then decides the Americans deserve to be haunted, and any way to make money and survive at their expense is justified. He tries to make amends to the skulls by chanting prayers so they can go to heaven. He teaches the other children how to catch shrimp, as his mother lies seemingly at the point of death.

Volume 6: Writing the Truth
The Hiroshima orphans put on a show of their misery to American soldiers to sell skulls of victims. They sell out, and look forward to buying lots of food, but a pickpocket robs them on the train. To their surprise, huge bags of food are thrown off the train they got off of once they discovered the theft. It's black market food that wouldn't get through a checkpoint. They try to sneak some for themselves by stuffing smaller amounts to simulate a baby and pregnancy, but get caught. It turns out, however, that the police eat black market rice too, since it's impossible to survive otherwise, and the orphans are able to escape them. No word comes from oldest brother Koji, who went off to work in the dangerous mines to earn money. He is drinking and gambling destructively. When Gen gets back home with rice, he finds that his mother is spitting up blood and has collapsed. They again need money they don't have for a doctor. Ryuta sticks up a casino to pay for Kimie's treatment, and the mob is after him, so he must flee Hiroshima. But every exit is staked, so he gives himself up to the police, who are the only ones who can insure he is not killed, and put in a reformatory. In July 1948, in Hiroshima City, Gen is tearing down a wall to collect bricks, as well as scrap iron to earn a living. A girl has hanged herself because of the radiation scars that made everyone treat her as a monster. Gen worries that Katsuko will try again. He writes Koji for money to help with their mother's hospital bills. He sees a girl put stones in her sleeves, preparing to throw herself into the river, and rescues her, only to discover it's Natsue. But she forgets her own woes when Gen hurts himself. She is angry at everyone who has treated her cruelly, and Gen decides to take her back to join the orphans, asking Katsuko to keep an eye on her. Gen is accused of being a thief when he sticks his head in a window to smell the beef he can't afford. Natsue tries again, so he takes her and Katsuko to see someone with arms wrapped in bandages, sewing with only her feet and mouth. They decide to learn to sew too, and open a clothing store. Gen isn't getting much for scrap, and sees other orphans getting paid well for copper, so he looks for where they got it. They steal it by boat from a shipyard, but the first time Gen and an orphan, Musubi, try, the shipyard owners are already watching and catch them, intending to beat them to death. They throw stones in the river, pretending to have jumped in and drowned. Then they fill their boat with too much copper, and it sinks. They go to a shooting range and dig up spent copper bullets, but dangerous men have already claimed the place. "Papa" declares he's ready to fight to the death for the orphans, who alone have treated him like a human being after Hiroshima, and scares the men off. He reveals that he's already about to die anyway from radiation. Gen and Musubi buy a sewing machine for Katsuko and Natsue only to find Papa slumped over in blood. His only regret is that he can't see his anti-American novel, THE END OF SUMMER, published. It is now four years since the Bomb was dropped, but people keep dying from the radioactivity. Ryuta and Noro, a slowpoke, escape from the Reformatory. They trick a man and woman into leaving their clothing by the river, then steal it so they don't look like two boys to those searching for them, but like a couple. Noro has sworn to kill his uncle who killed Noro's sister and sent him to the Reformatory. Ryuta is not recognised in his girlish disguise when he reaches home to discover Papa is in a coma. Gen is determined to publish the book somehow, although he's been turned down by every publisher.

Volume 7: Bones into Dust
Four years after the atomic bomb was dropped, Gen is determined to get his novel The End of Summer published so "Papa" can see it before he dies. Since no Japanese publisher dares print it, Ryuta suggests they have a prison do it. However, the prison needs paper, which costs money. They rescue Noro, nearly dead from his attempt to kill his uncle, and extract gold from his uncle. Gen asks for help from Mr. Pak, who is delighted to have the truth about what happened come out. Koreans suffered twice, once from being enslaved by Japanese, and again by the Bomb. He doesn't want money for his help. Since Ryuta can't read, Gen reads the book to him. The graphic descriptions of the hellish effects of the Bomb and the plea for everyone to make sure that nothing like this should ever happen again is too much for Ryuta, who begs him to stop. They return home to find "Papa" unresponsive, his heart stopped. Ryuta does CPR so "Papa" can see his published book. "Papa" is able to grasp Gen's wrist, perhaps showing that he understands, then succumbs for good. The orphans are orphaned yet again. A few days later, after they've given away all their copies of the book, they are taken by American soldiers to a U.S. Occupation base in Kure. A Japanese-American Lt. Mike Kurota interrogates them about the book. It's illegal to write about the A-bomb in Occupied Japan. He thinks Japan deserved it after Pearl Harbor. He decides to subject them to thought modification. A fellow prisoner explains that the Cannon Agency, a special operations team that runs covert actions for American interests, named after its director, Col. Jack Cannon, will torture them to try to turn them into spies. Later, in 1953, in the basement of the Iwasaki Mansion, torture devices and a water dungeon were exposed by writer Wataru Kaji after he was kidnapped and detained secretly for more than a year. Many others were never seen again. Gen, Ryuta, and Noro can't escape while locked in a cell, so Gen wounds himself with a loose nail, smears the blood, and tells the others to act ill. A guard is about to take them to the infirmary, but Lt. Kurota has seen this old trick before. Gen then trains them to be able to take torture better, while faking greater pain. First they're laughing about it, then quarreling angrily as they attack each other. Lt. Kurota concludes they've gone out of their minds and are useless for his purposes, so he orders them to be dumped. Gen vows revenge. The kids laugh at a taxi driver having a tantrum. He explains that someone has put sugar in his tank, ruining his means of livelihood. Gen asks Mr. Pak for sugar cubes—it's safer if he doesn't know why—so they can put American jeeps and trucks out of commission, creating work for Japanese mechanics. Gen puts on an impromptu comedy show to distract the Americans as the others commit sabotage. Returning home, he finds his mother home from the hospital, seemingly cured, but Akira reveals that she has 4 months to live and doesn't know it. Her stomach cancer has metastasized. It's hard for Gen and Akira to pretend all is well. As she talks about her arranged marriage to their father, who she grew to love, and how people who were against the war were tortured and killed even before it had started, Gen determines to earn money to send his mother to visit Kyoto, where she'd honeymooned, a last time. He finds out there's money to be made collecting poop for fertilizer. Koji arrives, having heard the news about their mother, full of shame for having drunk up the money he should have sent home, and Gen gives him the money he's earned so he can claim to be the one taking them all to Tokyo. When they arrive, she declares that she can now die happy, and rejoin their father. She knew all along that she wasn't cured, since her stomach pain hadn't gone away. When she dies, Gen refuses to have her cremated. He is determined to take her body to Kyoto so General MacArthur can see it, apologize for having used the Bomb, and promise never to do so again. He wants the Emperor, who declared war as a god, then admitted he was mortal when he lost, to apologize to her and take responsibility for starting the war. Koji has to knock him out to have their mother cremated. One person can't do this. All Japan must raise their voices together. Gen is desolate until he dreams of his parents encouraging him to be as the wheat and stand on his own feet.

Volume 8: Merchants of Death
By 25 June 1950, North and South Korea have become embroiled in war, and Japan is under threat of being dragged into the conflict. Gen and his teacher Mr. Ohta want everyone to do all they can to prevent war, but the class president, Aihara, who looks much like Gen, but with an ugly smile, believes war is inevitable, an unchangeable part of human nature, and needed to reduce the population. He challenges Gen to a fight after school. When Gen shows up, Aihara says he doesn't go for playfighting, but only to the death, and tosses Gen a knife. Gen wins, and Aihara insists he should finish him off, but Gen refuses. Ryuta, selling a dress Katsuko and Natsue have made, loses ¥1000 giving it away to a Hiroshima Carp baseball fan. He's a Carp fanatic, but the team keeps losing. The Americans make laws against antiwar protests, enforced by the right-wing hoods of the Blood-and-Thunder party, who attack Mr. Ohta. Gen pitches in, but it's Aihara, who turns out to have been orphaned by the Bomb too, whose accuracy pitching rocks wins the day. Aihara does not want to be taken to the hospital. When they take him anyway, they find he has a fractured skull, and may not live the night. Looking for his home,to find someone to visit him, they discover that Katsuo was adopted by a woman who had lost a son that he kept following because she looked like his dead mother. She reveals that he's already dying of leukemia—which has no cure—and keeps trying to commit suicide because he can't face death. Ryuta and Gen get him interested in life by practicing pitching outside his home. He can do it better—they've found him a purpose in life, to win games for the Carp. They've just seen the Charlie Chaplin film "Monsieur Verdoux" when the discover Mr. Ohta drunk. He buys sake for the minors even though they can't legally drink. He can't stand how Gen. MacArthur set up a National Police Reserve on Aug. 10th [sic] supposedly to train police, but actually to create a military to use in Korea after Japan was supposed to be without one. Tomorrow will be Aug. 6th [sic], and the Hiroshima City Police have announced they'll arrest anyone trying to have a protest against war. Mr. Ohta tells them how Mussolini's corpse was hung upside down after the war. Gen quotes from the movie they'd just seen, "One murder makes a villain—millions, a hero". Gen gets drunk too, and comes up with a plan for tomorrow. They all ring bells and pray for peace—even Aihara. Soon afterwards, the National Police Reserve was renamed the Japan Self-Defense Forces. Then Mr. Ohta resigns teaching—the only teacher who cared about his students, and didn't use corporal punishment. Gen is on his way to Mr. Ohta's home to try to talk him out of it, when he sees someone shooting up. Ryuta explains that this is a speed freak. In the war, soldiers were given Philopon—the original brand name for methamphetamine hydrochloride—to make them feel brave. Now it's legal in Japan, and lots of people are addicted. Gen is drinking whiskey when Natsue is overcome with pain from appendicitis. She'll need to be in the hospital for two weeks. When Gen goes to see Mr. Ohta the next day, he finds him shooting up, and learns that he didn't actually quit—he was fired by Gen. MacArthur in the Red Purge. "Incidents" keep happening, to make people think that labor union activists are committing sabotage. After being up all night in the hospital with Natsue, Gen is barely able to stay awake as he pleads with Mr. Ohta not to give up. As he conks out, Mr. Ohta breaks his hypodermic needle. The next day, the new teacher finds no students have showed up. They all chipped in to pay Mr. Ohta to teach them at his home, even though he's no longer certified to teach. Even Ryuta, who hasn't been in school since the Bomb was dropped 5 years ago is there. When the principal and teacher show up making all kinds of threats, that they won't be able to get jobs if they study with Mr. Ohta, because they'll all become evil Red Commies, Mr. Ohta takes a punch from Gen that was meant for the principal. Gen sends them off, they trip and fall down the stairs in their haste. Mr. Ohta promises to start a new school and reach out to the kids who had to quit school after the Bomb. Ryuta will be able to learn to read and to write love letters. The newspaper headlines read "U.N. forces launch Fierce Counterattack in Korea". Ryuta doesn't care about Korea's war, but Gen feels for the Koreans being attacked, and realizes that American planes are launched from Japan, which might be counterattacked. When they visit Natsue, they learn that her appendicitis scar has reopened, and she'll need another operation. They worry, wondering whether the A-bomb has anything to do with it. A car splashes them with mud as the driver and the woman with him laugh at them. Ryuta treats Gen to a fancy restaurant meal to cheer him up, but the couple arrive there too. The driver boasts about how rich he is from selling scrap metal for guns and bullets. War in Korea is good for business in Japan. Ryuta is willing to acccept his money to pay for laundering their clothes, much more than would be needed, but Gen is furious, and starts a brawl. When the restaurant owner calls for the cops, Ryuta reminds Gen he's wanted for murder, so they have to scram. Gen laments that humans are not improving at all as they rejoice in war. Fall. The city is planning to tear down Gen's home for a road through the Construction Law passed by the National Parliament as part of the Hiroshima Peace Memorial City. The brothers have 30 days to move. Natsue has had eight operations. After the first few, anesthetic stopped working. The Bomb's radiation destroyed her white blood cells, so the wound won't close. If pus gets into her bloodstream, she could die. She leaves the hospital and Gen must look for her. She's in Itsukaichi, determined to make a special pot. Ryuta learns that sardines are swarming by the bucketful in Itsukaichi, so he suggests they look for her there. Gen helps a woman who has hurt her back, and inside her home is Natsue. She reveals that the pot is for her own ashes, but Gen is determined she must live. He finds Koji getting drunk trying to handle his grief at the imminent destruction and learns that there's lots of money to be made by people claiming land of people who died from the Bomb and selling it for high prices with the help of crooked politicians. Gen gets drunk too. Gen eavesdrops on Koji's cconversation with his girlfriend Hiroko who is unwilling to wait two years to get married so Gen will be old enough to be on his own, and also unwilling to have Akira and Gen live with them. Akira decides to go to Osaka to become a businessman for peace, and Gen determines not to be a burden on Koji, but be self-reliant. He'll fight to preserve their home, with the fallback position that he's welcome to come live with the orphans. It's October 1950, and war in Korea is escalating, as is the threat of more nuclear war.

Volume 9: Breaking Down Borders
Gen and Ryuta resist the demolishment of Gen's home, throwing rocks from the roof, but in vain. Gen wounds himself in his own hand to always remember the pain. Natsue finishes her pot and returns home to the orphans, who are celebrating Gen's joining them. He sees a crack in the pot, the jar slips, and is broken. Natsue is too weak and ill to make another, after she had put all her heart and soul into this one. Gen runs off. He'd actually broken it on purpose to give her a reason to keep living, to make another, but it didn't work. Gen and Ryuta get into a fight, scaring off a fortuneteller's customers. He bashes them in the head with a plank. Ryuta summons the orphans to help get Gen to the hospital, but he isn't to be found. A fortuneteller says he went to the hospital and tells Natsue she'll be well in a month, with an auspicious future, complete with husband and four children. She is persuaded to go back to the hospital. Then Gen takes off his disguise. She dies of colorectal cancer. Someone from the Atomic Bomb Casualty Commission (ABCC) shows up offering to pay ¥30,000 and arrange for her cremation so they can study how to cure radiation sickness, but Gen sends them off angrily, accusing them of wanting this knowledge to treat Americans, not Japanese, in the next atomic war. Natsue died, six months into the Korean War, on Dec. 30th, 1950, the day that Gen. MacArthur convinced President Truman to plan to use nuclear weapons in Korea. Only world outrage against first use stopped it, although the USA threatened again in May 1953 and in April 1969 after Koreans shot down a U.S. reconnaissance plane. In January 1951 they bury Natsue's ashes in an urn Gen made. They are about to bury it on Mt. Hiji, but discover that the ABCC has erected buildings to collect corpses from Hiroshima. Gen decides to bury Natsue with his own family, but a boy snatches the box the urn is in and runs away. He thought something valuable must be inside. His grandfather is ashamed that his grandson has become a thief, but the boy is not. He is desperate to get his grandfather oil paints to finish his painting. Gen was given Seiji's painting tools on his death, to finish his painting, which Gen never did, and he's willing to give it to the grandfather, but he destroys all his paintings, realizing it was arrogant to think of himself as a great painter when he couldn't even support his family by painting, and had even driven his grandson to theft. Gen brings the paints to him anyhow, convincing him to keep painting whether or not his work is popular, and when the old man tells him about his youthful dreams, "Art has no borders", about using art to break down borders, that's what Gen decides to do with his life. Ryuta questions whether ideals will give you enough money to eat. Gen decides to combine art with earning a living by looking for training as a sign painter. However, he gets into a brawl with a sign painter, and accidentally ruins the sign advertising a Kurosawa double feature of "Rashomon" and "Stray Dogs" that needs to be done that day. He promises to work for free until he's repaid the damage, but the people at the shop are still mad, and the fighting results in Gen breaking the sign painter's arm. The grandfather, Seiga Amano, who is a better painter, offers to take over. The highly militaristic president of the company who commissioned the sign is pleased at being able to exploit both of them, although he blows a tire on his motor scooter and sprains his ankle. An underling, Kurosaki, is still jealous and has it in for them. The grandfather starts teaching Gen about perspective. On April 15, 1951, the headlines read that Gen. MacArthur will leave Japan on April 10 [sic]. President Truman is replacing him because he wanted to extend the Korean War into China and destroy communist China, but instead the president relieved him of his post as Supreme Commander in the Far East. Gen practices perspective night and day, improving, which makes Kurosaki furious, so he hires gangsters to cut Gen's arm off. He escapes with his arm, but his clothing is in shreds. Gen can't understand why he didn't simply ask Amano for lessons too, to improve. Kurosaki was a victim of the Bomb as well. Having lost all his family, he was "adopted" by a Buddhist priest who took him to an island and exploited and tortured him and 15 other orphans as slave labor. When a girl fell sick, the priest was unwilling to bother with taking her to the hospital, and she died. Kurosaki barely managed to escape the island alive, clinging to a tire on a supply boat. He and Gen agree that there's no Buddha or God; it's all lies and trickery for someone's convenience. American soldiers were given blessings to do justice dropping the Bomb on Nagasaki right onto a Christian church filled with fellow worshippers. If there were a God or Buddha, why wouldn't he get rid of wars and bombs? Then as Kurosaki was wandering miserably, trying to survive, he saw a beautiful rainbow that cheered him. Remembering his mother's stories of a treasure at the end, he looked, and found it was a painted sign, with the words "Peace in the Hearts of Hiroshima Citizens" written below. He decided to become a sign painter, and even though the head of the company was a tyrant, all was going well until Gen and Amano spoiled everything. Gen refuses to be blamed or to leave, having given his word to make it up for the damage he'd caused. He says they should compete to get better. Gen and the orphans see a sign saying "Lecture on Japan's Defense by Prefectural Assemblyman Denjiro Samejima, a Fighter for Love and Peace"—the same man who had called Gen's father a traitor, calling for peace, as their neighborhood chairman. Gen can't stand it, but a rainbow soothes them. Gen wanted to build rainbow bridges from country to country in a world without borders, free of war.

Volume 10: Never Give Up
It is March 1953, and Gen is graduating from middle school, although he doesn't go to school much now, learning to paint and working at the sign shop. Mr. Ohta has just started his own private academy with 10 students. Ryuta summarises news from 1952: on April 28, a treaty with America launched Japanese independence. On Bloody May Day, unpermitted demonstrators clashed with police outside the Imperial Palace, and on August 6, freed from American bans during occupation, a special issue of a magazine shocked Japan with photos of the devastation from the bomb which had never been seen before. The Prime Minister dissolves the Lower House after calling a questioner by a derogatory name. Then he invites everyone to cheer up by buying the dresses Katsuko and Natsue have been making. This displeases the owner of the dress shop he's outside of, but they come to an agreement that the store will buy the dresses from now on. One of the orphans, Musubi, has been keeping their savings in a pass book so they can set up their own dress shop when they have enough. There's a ceremony for the graduating class of the middle school Gen goes to, but rather than graduating peaceably—he will not be going on to high school—he protests the singing of the national anthem praising the Emperor who started the war, and details his war crimes. Some of the kids invite the principal and some of the teachers to a private thank-you ceremony, saying they want to present them with a gift, but actually, they beat up the teachers in revenge for all the beatings they were given. Gen puts a stop to it. A beautiful girl accidentally runs into Gen while trying to catch a street car, and he falls head over heels in love without knowing who she might be. Mr. Amano and Gen get themselves "fired" from the sign painting shop where they weren't being paid in the first place, for objecting to the militaristic talk of Mr. Nakao, the owner. Gen catches sight of the girl and follows her home. It turns out that her father is Mr. Nakao, who forbids her from having anything to do with him. Musubi stays out late, being pepped up by a bar owner with an energy shot. Ryuta asks Mitsuko, the girl Gen loves, to go out with him on a date, and shows her Gen's sketchbook filled with pictures of her and declarations of love. She explains that her father has forbidden it, and Ryuta goes off angry, spitting insults. This leads to Ryuta and Gen quarreling, and when Musubi arrives and fails to explain his absences, more fighting, which Katsuko can't stand. Musubi goes off to get back his good mood. Mitsuko is impressed by Gen's sketch book. Her father tells her she's the one important thing in his life, his dream being to see she's married to the perfect husband and providing grandchildren. She hates having his dreams forced down her throat. Musubi goes back to the bar for an energy shot, which he's told is full of vitamins. Mitsuko gets Gen's address from the store to come thank him for the sketch book, and agrees to model for more sketches. On July 27, 1953, an armistice is signed for peace in Korea. The dresses are selling well, but Ryuta and Katsuko wonder why Musubi is the only one not working, and where he is. Gen and Mitsuko go to the Itsukushima Shrine of Miyajima and lament that the deer there were nearly all killed off for food at the end of the war. Mitsuko confesses that she thinks she's a murderer because when the Bomb was dropped, she, a small child, was unable to carry her injured mother and ran for her own life. Gen also left his father, sister and brother. On his way home, Gen runs into Musubi on a street car, looking unwell. He shoves Gen and runs off to the bar for another shot, but can't pay. They tell him he'll be in agony for days, since he's totally addicted. Only now does he learn that the "vitamins" were actually illegal drugs. He steals money from the postal savings passbook of the orphans' savings toward a dress shop to pay for more shots. He returns home, claiming to be well, and sorry for his absence, but Gen catches him preparing to shoot up, and smashes the hypodermic. Musubi runs off, rather than face withdrawal. The Hiroshima ABCC announces a sharp rise in leukemia in atomic bomb survivors. Mitsuko decides to become a doctor, to fight back against the people who destroy lives through bombs and war. She tells how the Yakuza used Hiroshima orphans to kill other gangsters. A Yakuza takes offence, and picks a fight with her—but she wins. However, she is unwell, and unwilling to go to a doctor, because it might turn out to be an A-bomb illness. She dies of leukemia. Her father blames Gen, who blames her father's militarism. Her final letter to her father backs him up. Musubi has run through the passbook money, and tries to break into the bar to get drugs, but gets beaten up and dumped for dead. He makes it back to the orphans first. Gen vows to seek revenge, so Ryuta knocks him out so Ryuta, who has already killed two gangsters, can take care of it, leaving Gen free of murder. Ryuta is about to turn himself in, but is talked into escaping to Tokyo with Katsuko. As Gen goes to put Musubi's ashes with Gen's family, Mr. Amano encourages Gen to go to Tokyo as well, to become an artist, and test himself.

Themes

Major themes throughout the work are power, hegemony, resistance and loyalty.

Gen's family suffers as all families do in war. They must conduct themselves as proper members of society, as all Japanese are instructed in paying tribute to the Emperor. But because of a belief that their involvement in the war is due to the greed of the rich ruling class, Gen's father rejects the military propaganda and the family comes to be treated as traitors. Gen's family struggles with their bond of loyalty to each other and to a government that is willing to send teenagers on suicide missions in battle. This push and pull relationship is seen many times as Gen is ridiculed in school, mimicking his father's views on Japan's role in the war, and then is subsequently punished by his father for spouting things he learned through rote brainwashing in school.

Many of these themes are put into a much harsher perspective when portrayed alongside themes of the struggle between war and peace.

, author of  believes that the characters Katsuko and Natsue coopt but change the stereotypical "Hiroshima Maiden" story, as typified in Black Rain, as although courageous, Katsuko and Natsue are severely scarred both physically and mentally.

Translations
A volunteer pacifist organization, Project Gen, formed in Tokyo in 1976 to produce English translations. Leonard Rifas' EduComics published it, beginning in 1980, as Gen of Hiroshima, making it the "first full-length translation of a manga from Japanese into English to be published in the West". It was unpopular, and the series was cancelled after two volumes.

The group Rondo Gen published an Esperanto translation as Nudpieda Gen (Barefoot Gen) in 1982. The chief translator was Izumi Yukio.

The German Rowohlt Verlag published only the first volume in 1982 under their mass-market label "rororo". Carlsen Comics tried it again in 2004 but cancelled the publication after four volumes. Both publishers took the name Barfuß durch Hiroshima (Barefoot through Hiroshima).

The first volume was published in Norwegian in 1986 by GEVION norsk forlag A/S. The Norwegian title is Gen, Gutten fra Hiroshima (Gen, the Boy from Hiroshima). A similar edition in Swedish (Gen – Pojken från Hiroshima) was published in 1985 by Alvglans förlag, which may have been the earliest published manga in Swedish.

The first volume was published in Finnish in 1985 by Jalava. It became the first Japanese comic to be published in Finland. However, publishing was later abandoned. The Finnish title is Hiroshiman poika ("The Son of Hiroshima"), and Finnish translation was done by Kaija-Leena Ogihara. In 2006 Jalava republished the first volume (with its original translation) and continued with publication of second volume.

All 10 volumes were published in Poland by Waneko in 2004–2011 under the title Hiroszima 1945: Bosonogi Gen.

An Arabic translation was published in Egypt by Maher El-Sherbini, a professor in the department of Japanese Language and Japanese literature at Cairo University. He began the project in 1992 when he was an exchange student at the Hiroshima University Graduate School of Letters, where he had completed his master's and doctorate's degrees. The first volume was released in January 2015 and since then all 10 volumes have been translated.

New Society Publishers produced a second English-language run of the series in graphic novel format (as Barefoot Gen: The Cartoon Story of Hiroshima) starting in 1988.

New English edition
A new English translation has been released by Last Gasp (starting in 2004) with an introduction by Art Spiegelman, who has compared the work to his own work, Maus (which is about the experiences of Spiegelman's father during the Holocaust in Europe).

 
 
 
 
 
 
 
 
 
 

Nakazawa planned to present a set of the series to US President Barack Obama to caution against nuclear proliferation.

Media

Films

Live-action
In 1976, 1977 and 1980, Tengo Yamada directed three live-action film adaptations. In 2009, a Hollywood producer expressed interest in a studio version of the manga.

 Barefoot Gen (1976)
 Barefoot Gen: Explosion of Tears (1977)
 Barefoot Gen: Part 3 Battle of Hiroshima (1980)

Animated films
Two animated films were based on the manga, in 1983 and 1986, both directed by Mori Masaki for a production company that Nakazawa founded.
 Barefoot Gen (1983)
 Barefoot Gen 2 (1986)

Barefoot Gen 2 is set three years after the bomb fell. It focuses on the continuing survival of Gen and orphans in Hiroshima.

Initially released individually on dub-only VHS tape by Streamline Pictures, and then dub-only DVD by Image Entertainment, Geneon eventually sold bilingual versions of the film on DVD as a set. In 2017, Discotek Media published both films on Blu-ray with both the Japanese and English languages available in it, on December 26.

TV drama
A two episode TV drama was produced by Fuji Television in 2007 and was aired over two days:
 Barefoot Gen (2007)

Books
10 books have been published about Barefoot Gen.

Theatre productions
There have been a number of stage play adaptations of Barefoot Gen produced in Japan.

In July 1996, the first stage adaptation in English was premiered at the Crucible Theatre, Sheffield, UK. The production was a collaboration between the Crucible Theatre and Theatre Zenshinza, Tokyo, Japan. In 1994 British theatre director Bryn Jones travelled to Japan to request Mr. Nakazawa's permission to adapt the first volume as a play. Permission was granted and Jones returned to Sheffield to prepare the production; research, design and dramatisation with the Crucible company, Tatsuo Suzuki and Fusako Kurahara. Mr. Nakazawa subsequently travelled to the UK to attend final rehearsals and gave post show talks after the opening performances. The final manuscript was adapted and dramatised by Tatsuo Suzuki and Bryn Jones and translated by Fusako Kurahara. The production received a Japan Festival Award 1997 for outstanding achievements in furthering the understanding of Japanese culture in the United Kingdom.

Operas and musicals
Some operas and musicals of Barefoot Gen have been on show.

Reception
The manga has sold more than 10 million copies worldwide.

Controversy
In December 2012, access to Barefoot Gen became restricted in elementary schools and junior high schools of Matsue city in Japan, after a claim was made that Barefoot Gen "describes atrocities by Japanese troops that did not take place". This was reviewed after 44 of 49 school principals polled in the city wanted the restriction removed – the curb was later lifted in August 2013.

Nakazawa's widow, Misayo, had expressed shock that children's access to the work was being curbed, explaining that "war is brutal. It expresses that in pictures, and I want people to keep reading it".

See also

 Honkawa Elementary School Peace Museum
 White Light/Black Rain: The Destruction of Hiroshima and Nagasaki (2007)
 Grave of the Fireflies

References

External links

 Full manga of 
 
 
 Group of volunteers translating and publishing a comic Barefoot Gen

 
1970s manga
1980s manga
Autobiographical anime and manga
Anime and manga controversies
Anti-Americanism
Anti-war comics
Geneon USA
Historical anime and manga
Japanese drama television series
Last Gasp titles
Novels about the atomic bombings of Hiroshima and Nagasaki
Novels by Keiji Nakazawa
Manga series
Shōnen manga
Shueisha franchises
Shueisha manga